The Nigerian Law School is an educational institution set up by the Government of Nigeria in 1962 to provide a Nigerian legal education to foreign-trained lawyers, and to provide practical training for aspiring Legal Practitioners in Nigeria. Until the school was established, legal practitioners in Nigeria had received the requisite training in England and had been called to the English Bar.

Curriculum
The Law School offers course in criminal and civil litigation, property and corporate law, as well as a course in ethics. Over 70,000 students have graduated from the Nigerian Law School.
Anyone who has obtained a University degree in law and wants to practice as lawyers in Nigeria must attend the Nigerian Law School. The Council of Legal Education gives certificates to students who pass the Bar Part II examinations, and these students are then called to the Bar.

Locations
Its campus in Lagos was set up in 1962, moving to its current location in 1969. The law school headquarters was relocated to the town of Bwari near Abuja in 1997.
At the time of the move, hostels and the main auditorium were still under construction. The town had no hospital, no telephone and banking services, and the school was constructing its own borehole to provide potable water.
The Augustine Nnamani Campus is located in Agbani, Enugu State. A fourth campus is located in Bagauda, Kano State. There are two additional campuses now which brings it to a total of 6 campuses. One in Yenegoa, Bayelsa State and the sixth in Yola, Adamawa State.

Notable alumni 

 
 
 Abdullahi Adamu, governor of Nasarawa State
 Senator Godswill Akpabio, governor of Akwa Ibom State
 Issifu Omoro Tanko Amadu, justice of the Supreme Court of Ghana
 Sullivan Chime, governor of Enugu State
 Kayode Ajulo - Administrator, Arbitrator, Lawyer,
 Solomon Dalung, Minister of Youth and Sports
 Oladipo Diya, Chief of General Staff
 Donald Duke, governor of Cross River State
 Kanayo O. Kanayo, actor
 Alex Ekwueme, first elected Vice President of Nigeria
 Abba Kyari, Chief of Staff to President Muhammadu Buhari from 2015
 Simon Lalong, governor of Plateau State
 Tahir Mamman, Professor of law, Senior Advocate of Nigeria (SAN) and director-general of Nigeria Law School from 2005 to 2013
 Richard Mofe-Damijo, actor
 Lai Mohammed, Minister of Information
 Mary Odili, Justice of the Supreme Court of Nigeria and former First Lady of Rivers State
 Bianca Ojukwu, Nigerian ambassador to Spain
 Chris Okewulonu, Chief of Staff to Imo State Government
 Kenneth Okonkwo, actor
Tim Owhefere, Nigerian politician
 Umaru Shinkafi, Federal Commissioner of Internal Affairs
 Gabriel Suswam, governor of Benue State
 Edwin Ume-Ezeoke, Speaker of the Nigerian House of Representatives during the Second Republic

News
In August 2009, a legal practitioner Asbayir Abubakar called for reductions in the fees paid at the Nigerian Law School in order to accommodate the less-privileged into the legal profession. In November 2009, the Director-General of the Nigerian Law School, Prof Tahir Mamman SAN, said that students who passed through unauthorized law faculties would not be admitted into the Nigerian Law School. He said the Council of Legal Education will refer law Professors and teachers managing illegal law faculties to the disciplinary committee of the Body of Benchers. This is why Prof Tahir Mamman SAN is referred to as the most successful Director General since the inception of the institution. Mr O. A. Onadeko the previous Deputy Director General of the Lagos Campus served as the Director General of the Nigerian Law School from 2013 to 2018. In February 2018 Prof. Isa Chiroma was appointed as the new Director General 

The Nigeria Law School is one of the most prestigious and credible institutions in Nigeria.

See also

 Lists of law schools

References

1962 establishments in Nigeria
Educational institutions established in 1962
Nigerian Law School